The Journal of Behavioral Optometry was a peer-reviewed medical journal published by the Optometric Extension Program Foundation. It covered clinically relevant behavioral, functional, and developmental aspects of the visual system. It included the following categories of articles:  
 clinical case reports  
 preliminary and completed clinically relevant research reports  
 speculative reports of new and adapted clinical diagnostic and therapeutic measures  
 literature reviews  
 guest editorials  
 essays  
 viewpoint articles

It was discontinued in 2012 in favour of the new journal Optometry & Visual Performance.

References

External links 

Publications established in 1990
Ophthalmology journals
Bimonthly journals
English-language journals
Academic journals published by learned and professional societies